Charaxes marieps, the Marieps emperor, is a butterfly of the family Nymphalidae. It is found in South Africa.

The wingspan is 48–60 mm in males and 65–70 mm in females. Has two broods from September to November and March to May.

Larvae feed on Ochna species. The habitat is montane forest.

Notes on the biology of marieps are given by Pringle et al (1994).

Taxonomy
Charaxes marieps is a member of the large species group Charaxes etheocles

References

Victor Gurney Logan Van Someren, 1966 Revisional notes on African Charaxes (Lepidoptera: Nymphalidae). Part III. Bulletin of the British Museum (Natural History) (Entomology) 45-101.
M. C. Williams and J.Boomker, 1980 The life cycle of Charaxes marieps. Journal of the Lepidopterists' Society
34(3), 1980, 295-301 pdf

External links
Charaxes marieps images at Consortium for the Barcode of Life

marieps
Butterflies described in 1957
Endemic butterflies of South Africa